Huayqueriana is an extinct genus of South American litoptern, related to Macrauchenia, and belonging to the same family, Macraucheniidae. It was formerly known as Macrauchenidia latidens, described in 1939 by Cabrera, but redefined as Huayqueriana in 2016 based on the earlier name convention of Rovereto 1914. The genus is named after the Huayquerías Formation and the eponymous Huayquerian South American land mammal age defined at the formation.

Classification 
Cladogram based in the phylogenetic analysis published by Schmidt et al., 2014, showing the position of Huayqueriana:

References

Bibliography 
 

Macraucheniids
Miocene mammals of South America
 
Neogene Argentina
Fossils of Argentina
Cerro Azul Formation
Fossil taxa described in 1914
Prehistoric placental genera